The Japanese anime series Yakushiji Ryōko no Kaiki Jikenbo, which aired on July 5, 2008 to September 27, 2008 for 13 episodes, was directed by Tarō Iwasaki and animated by Dogakobo studios. News of a TV adaptation for the light novels series by Yoshiki Tanaka was announced in 2007.

Ryōko Yakushiji, a graduate of Tokyo University's Law Faculty, is currently among the youngest Superintendent in the Tokyo Metropolitan Police Department. With the assistance of her subordinate Junichirō Izumida, Ryōko works with her colleagues including her rival and fellow Superintendent Yukiko Muromachi, alongside JACES security forces personnel and her personal maids Lucienne and Marianne to investigate and resolve seemingly paranormal, supernatural or bizarre events before they go out of hand. The young Superintendent later becomes the target of a conspiracy, hatched from the shadows by an influential socialite named Ruriko Isurugi and supported by extremist factions in the Japan Private Police, Shiba and the JGSDF, aimed at creating a true Japanese military.

Yakushiji Ryōko no Kaiki Jikenbo had been aired previously at BS11 Digital, Chiba TV, KBS Kyoto, Sun TV, Tokyo MX, TV Aichi, Television Saitama and TVK. Titles of the opening and ending themes are rendered in French. The opening theme Thème Principal and ending themes À demain sur la lune (#1,3), Ryoko 2 (#2,6), Songe d'une nuit d'été (#4,7,9,10,12), La Vie en rose (#5),  Le combat (#8,11) and Theme principal La chanson d'atsuko (#13)  are all sung by KATSU.

DVDs of the series were released in Japan on September 26, 2008, October 22, 2008, December 25, 2008 and January 21, 2009. Each volume contains 3 episodes, except for the 3rd volume which has 4 episodes.

Episodes

References

General
 
 

Specific

External links
 Starchild's Official Site 
 Tokyo MX's Official Site 

Yakushiji Ryoko no Kaiki Jikenbo